The 1970 Major League Baseball postseason was the playoff tournament of Major League Baseball for the 1970 season. The winners of each division advance to the postseason and face each other in a League Championship Series to determine the pennant winners that face each other in the World Series.

In the American League, the Baltimore Orioles and Minnesota Twins returned to the postseason for the second straight year. In the National League, the Cincinnati Reds made their first postseason appearance since the 1961 World Series, and the Pittsburgh Pirates made their first appearance since the 1960 World Series. Both the Pirates and Reds would make five more postseason appearances throughout the decade.

The playoffs began on October 3, 1970, and concluded on October 15, 1970, with the Baltimore Orioles defeating the Cincinnati Reds in five games in the 1970 World Series. It was the Orioles' second championship in franchise history.

Playoff seeds
The following teams qualified for the postseason:

American League
 Baltimore Orioles – AL East champions, best record in AL, best record in baseball, 108–54
 Minnesota Twins – AL West champions, 98–64

National League
 Pittsburgh Pirates – NL East champions, 89–73
 Cincinnati Reds – NL West champions, best record in NL, 102–60

Playoff bracket

American League Championship Series

Minnesota Twins vs. Baltimore Orioles

This was a rematch of the previous year's series, which the Orioles won in a 3–0 sweep. Once again, the Orioles would sweep the Twins and advance to the World Series for the second consecutive year. 

This ALCS was even more lopsided than the previous year's, as the Twins were once again outmatched by the Orioles. Game 1 was an offensive duel which the Orioles won 10-6. Dave McNally had a complete game performance in Game 2 and the Orioles blew out the Twins to go up 2-0 in the series headed to Baltimore. Game 2 of this ALCS was also the last postseason game ever played at Metropolitan Stadium. Jim Palmer pitched yet another complete game for the Orioles in Game 3 as they won by a 6-1 score to secure the pennant.

The Twins would not return to the postseason again until 1987, where they defeated the Detroit Tigers in five games in the ALCS en route to a World Series title. 

The Orioles returned to the ALCS the next year, sweeping the Oakland Athletics before falling in the World Series.

National League Championship Series

Pittsburgh Pirates vs. Cincinnati Reds

This was the first postseason meeting between the Pirates and Reds. The Reds swept the Pirates to advance to the World Series for the first time since 1961. In Pittsburgh for Game 1, the Reds shutout the Pirates in extra innings thanks to a solid pitching performance from Gary Nolan. The Pirates' offense was neutered yet again in Game 2 as the Reds won 3-1. The Reds clinched the pennant in Cincinnati as they won by one run in Game 3.

The Pirates and Reds would meet in the postseason again five more times - in the NLCS in 1972 (Reds victory), 1975 (Reds victory), 1979 (Pirates victory), and 1990 (Reds victory), as well as the 2013 NL Wild Card Game (Pirates victory).

The Pirates would return to the NLCS the next year, where they defeated the San Francisco Giants in four games en route to a World Series title.

1970 World Series

Baltimore Orioles (AL) vs. Cincinnati Reds (NL) 

After their humiliating defeat in the previous year's World Series at the hands of the New York Mets, the Orioles defeated the Reds in five games to win their second World Series title in franchise history.

The Orioles stole Game 1 on the road in Cincinnati, as Brooks Robinson hit a solo home run in the top of the seventh to give the O's a 4-3 victory. Game 1 was marred by controversy during the sixth inning - The Reds had Bernie Carbo on third and Tommy Helms on first when Ty Cline, batting for Woody Woodward, hit a high chopper in front of the plate. Home plate umpire Ken Burkhart positioned himself in front of the plate to call the ball fair or foul as Carbo sped home. Baltimore catcher Elrod Hendricks fielded the ball and turned to tag Carbo with Burkhart blocking the way. Hendricks tagged the sliding Carbo with his glove hand while holding the ball in his bare right hand, and Burkhart was knocked to the ground as he had his back to the play. When Burkhart turned around, he saw Carbo out of the baseline because Burkhart was actually blocking Carbo's direct path to the plate as Hendricks held the ball. Burkhart signaled Carbo out without asking for help from the other umpires. Replays showed that Hendricks tagged Carbo with an empty mitt, but Carbo also missed the plate on the slide, although he stood on it when he argued the "out" call. Both Carbo and Sparky Anderson vehemently argued the call, to no avail.

In Game 2, the Reds jumped out to an early 4-0 lead after the first three innings, however the Orioles went on a 6-1 run through the next three innings to win by one run and go up 2-0 in the series headed to Baltimore. Dave McNally had yet another postseason complete game performance in Game 3 as the Orioles blew out the Reds by a 9-3 score to take a 3-0 series lead. Even though the Reds took Game 4 by one run to avoid a sweep, it wasn't enough. The Orioles, thanks to a complete game performance from Mike Cuellar, blew out the Reds again to clinch the championship in Game 5. 

After the World Series win by the Orioles, the NFL's Baltimore Colts went on to win Super Bowl V, giving Baltimore both World Series and Super Bowl champions within the span of a year.

The Orioles returned to the World Series the next year, but were defeated by the Pittsburgh Pirates in seven games. The Orioles would win their next championship in 1983, where they defeated the Philadelphia Phillies in five games. The Reds returned to the World Series in 1972, but fell to the Oakland Athletics in seven games, it would be in 1975 that the Reds would taste championship success.

References

External links
 League Baseball Standings & Expanded Standings - 1970

 
Major League Baseball postseason